A list of awards and nominations received by Ziana Zain.

Awards: Local & International

1984
Bintang Selangor Singing Competition
Winner of Bintang Selangor

1994
Malaysia's Popular Star Awards (Anugerah Bintang Popular)
Most Popular Supporting Actress

1995
Voice of Asia, Almathy, Kazakhstan
Main Award of Voice of Asia.
Malaysia's Popular Star Awards (Anugerah Bintang Popular)
Most Popular Artiste
Most Popular Female Singer
Most Popular Supporting Actress
Most Popular TV Entertainer
Music Industry Awards (Anugerah Industri Muzik)
Best Vocal Performance in an Album (Female)  - Setia Ku Di Sini

1996
Tokyo Music Festival, Tokyo, Japan
Golden Voice Awards, Gold Medal (Anggapanmu)
Singapore Music Award, Singapore
Most Popular Female Singer
Most Popular Song - Korban Cinta
Malaysia's Popular Star Awards (Anugerah Bintang Popular)
Most Popular Film Actress
Entertainment Media Award (Anugerah Media Hiburan)
Sexiest Female Artiste 
Nescafe's 10 hits Awards (Pujaan 10 Nescafe)
Best Solo Performance - Bersama Akhirnya 
Screen Film Awards (Anugerah Skrin)
Best Supporting Actress

1997
Nescafe's 10 hits Awards (Pujaan 10 Nescafe)
Best Solo Performance - Korban Cinta 
Screen Film Awards (Anugerah Skrin)
Best Actress - Merah 
Malaysian Film Festival (FFM)
Best Actress - Merah 
Music Industry Awards (Anugerah Industri Muzik)
Best Pop Album - Puncak Kasih

1998
Malaysia's Popular Star Awards (Anugerah Bintang Popular)
Most Popular Film Actress
Entertainment Media Award (Anugerah Media Hiburan)
Most Beautiful Artiste 
Malaysian Songs Championship Awards (Anugerah Juara Lagu)
Best Ballad - Puncak Kasih
Malaysia Music Video Awards (Anugerah Video Muzik Malaysia)
Best Music Video - Puncak Kasih

2000
Entertainment Media Award (Anugerah Media Hiburan)
Best Cover Magazine

2002
Singapore Prime Festival, Singapore
Best Entertainment Show - Bersama Ziana
Malaysian Songs Championship Awards (Anugerah Juara Lagu)
Best Ballad - Menadah Gerimis

2003
ERA's Award
Choice Pop Song - Lembah Asmara

2004
ERA's Award
Choice Pop Song - Bukan 
Malaysia's Popular Star Awards (Anugerah Bintang Popular)
Best Dressed: Anugerah Bintang Popular 
URS Glamor Award (Anugerah URS Glamor)
Best Idol Of The Decade

2010
Mentor 4 Song Competition
 Champion 
Awarded Pingat Jasa Bakti Seniman by Yayasan Insan Melaka (YIM)

Local & International Recognitions

1992
Represent Malaysia in Asian Voices project.
Awarded Gold Disc for album Madah Berhelah by RIM (40 000 copies)

1993
Represent Malaysia in Asian Pop Queen Festival, Fukuoka & Hiroshima, Japan.
Recorded 2 songs in Colors of Love album together with 5 best Asian singers.
Groove me duet with Jo Awayan
Feel Me Out
Awarded Platinum Disc for album Ziana Zain by RIM (60 000 copies)

1995
Listed in Malaysian Book Of Records as the First Female Artist to Win International Competition
Represent Malaysia in musical concert Asia Live aired by Japan's NHK satellite TV Channel Two.
Duet with Indonesia Pop Diva, Dessy Fitri in the song Cinta di akhir garisan during Anugerah Industri Muzik
Awarded 3× Platinum Disc for album Setiaku Di Sini by RIM (180 000 copies)

1996
Bestowed the Bintang Perkhidmatan Cemerlang by Sultan of Selangor
Recorded 2 songs in A Musical Salute to Disney album
A Whole New World 
The Beauty and The Beast 
Duet with Indonesia Great Maestro, Late Broery Marantika with the song Dekat Tapi Jauh in Ziana Zain Unplugged Concert 
Represent Malaysia in musical special The Big Show held in Singapore 
Awarded Platinum Disc for album Ziana Zain Unplugged by RIM (80 000 copies)
Awarded Arts and Cultural Leader by Majlis Belia Selangor

1997
Represent Malaysia in Konsert Senandung Serumpun, Indonesia
Invited together with 15 Asian and International celebrities to Omega International Celebrity Club at Crans Montana, an exclusive ski and golf resort in Switzerland.
Represent Malaysian in Asian Music Scene 1997 that been held in Putra World Trade Centre, Kuala Lumpur
Awarded 3× Platinum Disc for album Puncak Kasih by RIM (150 000 copies)

1998
Awarded 3× Platinum for album Best of Ziana Zain by RIM (100 000 copies)

1999
Awarded Platinum Disc for album Ziana Zain 99 by RIM (50 000 copies)

2001
Awarded Bintang Cemerlang Melaka by TYT Melaka.

2002
Invited to St Moritz, Switzerland as an appreciation for her sixth years as Omega ambassador
Invited to perform in Dazzling Asian Divas Gala Ball, Singapore
Invited to the launching of OMEGA Seamaster Aqua Terra Raffles Marina that held in Singapore
Perform live at Jerudong Park Amphitheatre, Brunei in Ziana Zain Unplugged Concert 2002, the same  place where Michael Jackson ever performed
Awarded Platinum Disc for album Aku Cintakan Mu by RIM (45 000 copies)

2003
Ziana was brought to Auckland, New Zealand for Omega Seamaster launching
Listed as The Most Glamorous Celebrity by GLAM Magazine.

2004
Invited to the launching of OMEGA Bijoux collection at Singapore with Anna Kournikova
Represent Malaysia in Konsert Serumpun Budaya, in Indonesia
Listed as The Most Glamorous Celebrity by GLAM Magazine.

2005
Awarded Pingat Setia Ahmad Shah (SAP) From Sultan of Pahang.
Listed as The Most Glamorous Celebrity by GLAM Magazine.

2007
Ziana Zain the only Malaysian artist been invited to FENDI's Summer Collection Fashion Show in Great Wall of China, Beijing
Her cover on InTrend Magazine had won Pre-Printing Excellence Award in 4th Asian print Awards Shanghai, China

2010
Invited by Louis Vuitton to Australia for photo-shoot with LV's products.

2011
Listed as Top 10 Fastest Trend Worldwide at Twitter.
Listed as Top 8 Best Asia Angel Voice by One of the Famous Thailand's Blog.
Listed as No 6 for Hot Asian Mom by Lori Boyd from manmade website.

Nomination & Finalist

Malaysia

Malaysian Song Competition Awards (Anugerah Juara Lagu)
Finalist - Madah Berhelah (1992) - Ballad
Finalist - Kemelut Di Muara Kasih (1996) - Ballad
Finalist - Kalau Mencari Teman (1997) - Ethnic Creative
Finalist - Senja Nan Merah - duet with Awie (1997) - Ballad
Finalist - Syurga Di Hati Kita (1999)- Ballad
Finalist - Dingin (2008) - Ballad
Music Industry Awards (Anugerah Industri Muzik)
Nominated Best Vocal Performance in an Album (Female) - Ziana Zain (1993)
Nominated Best Album Cover Design - Setiaku Di Sini (1995)
Nominated Best Pop Album - Setia Ku Di Sini (1995)
Nominated Best Vocal Performance in an Album (Female) - Live MTV Unplugged (1996)
Nominated Best Vocal Performance in an Album (Female) - Puncak Kasih (1997)
Nominated Song Of The Year - Puncak Kasih (1997)
Nominated Album Of The Year - Puncak Kasih (1997)
Nominated Best Vocal Performance in an Album (Female) - Ziana Zain (1999)
Nominated Song Of The Year - Pusaka Rimba with Dayang Nurfaizah (1999)
Nominated Best Vocal Performance in an Album (Female)  - Aku Cintakan Mu (2001)
Nominated Best Pop Album - Aku Cintakan Mu (2001)
Nominated Best Vocal Performance in an Album (Female)  - No.1's live (2004)
Nominated Best Pop Song - Dingin (2009)
Malaysian Film Festival (Festival Filem Malaysia)
Nominated - Best Actress - Merah (1997)
Nominated - Best Supporting Actress - Maria Mariana (1997)
Nominated - Best Supporting Actress - Magika (2010)
Entertainment Media Awards
Nominated - Sensational Female Singer (2002)
Nominated - Sensational Female Singer (2003/2004)
Nominated - Sexiest Female Artist (2002)
Nominated - Sexiest Female Artist (2003/2004)

Singapore

Planet Music Award
Nominated - Best Song - Menadah Gerimis (2002)
Nominated - Best Album - Aku Cintakan Mu (2002)
Mtv Asia Award
Nominated - Favorite Female Singer in Malaysia (2002)

Other Contributions

Recorded theme song for 15th Southeast Asian (SEA) Games  in 1989 
Lukisan Wajah Kasih
Recorded theme song of 16th Commonwealth Gamesin 1998
Strive for the Best 
Performed during opening of XIII Malaysian Games (SUKMA) in 2010

References

Ziana Zain
Awards